"Feel" (stylized as "FEEL.") is a song by American rapper Kendrick Lamar, from his fourth studio album Damn, released on April 14, 2017. The fifth track on the album (tenth on the Collector's Edition of Damn), the song was written by Lamar and Mark Spears,  Sounwave, and produced by Sounwave. The song features bass from bass guitarist Thundercat and vocals from Chelsea Blythe.

Lyrics 
The song sees Lamar taking a deeper look into the void and isolation caused by fame and success, specifically how he feels detached from his family and friends.

A common recurrence in "Feel" is the phrase "Ain't nobody prayin' for me", a sentiment that Lamar "revisits elsewhere".

Critical reception 
In a positive review, writers of Rolling Stone magazine said "with round, textured notes from the Grammy-winning bass virtuoso Thundercat and a rickety, rim-shot drum pulse, "Feel" nods to the live-musician inflections of To Pimp a Butterfly – or the sixth track from last year's untitled unmastered. Ann Powers of NPR Music also gave a positive review, saying "Feel" was the first song that "jumped out" at her on Damn. Powers also commented that the song is reminiscent of To Pimp a Butterfly.

Samples 
The song contains a sample of the song "Stormy" by American musician O. C. Smith from the album For Once in My Life. It also contains interpolations from "Don't Let Me Down" by Fleurie from the album Love and War.

Live performances
Lamar has performed "Feel" as an encore on the Damn tour.

Credits and personnel 
Credits adapted from the official Damn digital booklet.
Kendrick Lamar – songwriter
Mark Spears – songwriter, producer, mixing
Thundercat – bass
Chelsea Blythe – additional vocals
Matt Schaeffer – additional guitar, mixing
Derek  Ali – mixing
Tyler Page – mix assistant
Cyrus Taghipour – mix assistant

Charts

Certifications

References 

2017 songs
Kendrick Lamar songs
Songs written by Kendrick Lamar
Songs written by Sounwave
Jazz rap songs